Josiah Alfred Hanan (12 May 1868 – 22 March 1954), known to his colleagues as Joe Hanan, was a New Zealand politician, cabinet minister, and legislative councillor. He also served as Mayor of Invercargill, and as Chancellor of the University of New Zealand.

Early life
Hanan was born in Invercargill, New Zealand, and educated at Invercargill Central School (dux) and Southland Boys' High School. He was a civil and criminal lawyer 1889–1899 with a good reputation, defending Minnie Dean and John Keown on murder charges.

Political career

He entered politics in 1894, when he became a borough councillor. In 1896, he was elected Mayor of Invercargill (the youngest, and the first NZ-born). In 1899 he was elected as the member of the House of Representatives for the Invercargill electorate. He held the electorate for the next 26 years, and retired at the 1925 election.

In 1912 he was appointed Minister of Education, Minister of Justice, and Minister of Stamp Duties in the short lived cabinet of Thomas Mackenzie. He also served in the wartime National Ministry, holding the portfolios of education (1915–1919), justice (1917), and immigration (1915). On his retirement from the House in 1925 he was appointed as a Member of the Legislative Council, a position he held until its abolition in 1950. From 1932 to 1939, he was Chairman of Committees.

Hanan was better known to his colleagues as Joe.

Family and death
Hanan married Abigail Susan Graham in 1896, but she died in 1898. Then he married Susanna Murray and they had two sons. The family would commute to Wellington for the parliamentary sessions and their boys attended boarding school there. When Hanan retired from Parliament in 1925, they moved to Dunedin, where by then their boys were attending university. His brother James Albert Hanan had a son, Ralph Hanan, who would later become Mayor of Invercargill and represented the Invercargill electorate in Parliament, where he held several cabinet posts.

Josiah Hanan died in Dunedin on 22 March 1954, where he was cremated. He was survived by his sons and his wife. Susanna Hanan died on 12 February 1970 in Dunedin and her ashes were scattered.

Notes

References

|-

|-

|-

|-

|-

1868 births
1954 deaths
People educated at Southland Boys' High School
Members of the New Zealand House of Representatives
Members of the Cabinet of New Zealand
Members of the New Zealand Legislative Council
19th-century New Zealand lawyers
New Zealand Liberal Party MPs
Invercargill City Councillors
Mayors of Invercargill
New Zealand education ministers
New Zealand MPs for South Island electorates
19th-century New Zealand politicians
Justice ministers of New Zealand